Diploderma yangi is endemic to China.

References

Diploderma
Reptiles of China
Reptiles described in 2022